Dan W. Brock (December 1937 – September 26, 2020) was an American philosopher, bioethicist, and professor emeritus at Harvard University and Brown University.  He was the Frances Glessner Lee Professor Emeritus of Medical Ethics in the Department of Global Health and Social Medicine at Harvard Medical School, the former Director of the Division of Medical Ethics (now the Center for Bioethics) at the Harvard Medical School, and former Director of the Harvard University Program in Ethics and Health (PEH).

Education and career

Brock earned his B.A. in economics from Cornell University and his Ph.D. in philosophy from Columbia University.  He taught philosophy for many years at Brown University, where he held the Tillinghast Professorship.  He also served as a member of the Department of Clinical Bioethics at the National Institutes of Health.  

He was president of the American Association of Bioethics (AAB) in 1995–96, and was a founding board member of the American Society for Bioethics and Humanities. He was a Fellow of the Hastings Center, a bioethics research institution, served as a board member and received the Henry Knowles Beecher Award for lifetime achievement in bioethics from them.

Dr. Brock retired as a professor in 2014, but remained an editorial board member of 12 professional journals in ethics, bioethics and health policy, and lectured widely at national and international conferences, professional societies, universities, and health care institutions. Most recently he served on a panel that updated 20-year-old guidelines and recommendations for evaluating cost-effectiveness in health and medicine, published in the Journal of the American Medical Association, September 13, 2016.

The American Society for Bioethics and Humanities, a bioethics research institution of which he was a founding board member conferred upon Dan Brock their Lifetime Achievement Award on October 19, 2018, in Anaheim CA, during their 20th Annual Meeting (October 18–21, 2018), when their theme was "The Future is Now: Bioethics and Humanities Re-Imagine an Uncertain World".

Philosophical work

Dan Brock published over 150 articles and co-authored 6 books relating to bioethics and philosophy and served on numerous editorial boards.  He worked with various international organizations on bioethics as a consultant including the World Health Organization and presented papers and talks all over the world.

See also
 American Society for Bioethics and Humanities
 American philosophy
 Health equity
 List of American philosophers

References

External links
 Dan Brock's publications
 Dan Brock's publications via Harvard Catalyst profile
 American Society for Bioethics and Humanities

American ethicists
Living people
Harvard Medical School faculty
Cornell University alumni
Columbia Graduate School of Arts and Sciences alumni
Hastings Center Fellows
Brown University faculty
Boston articles needing attention
New York (state) articles needing attention
20th-century American philosophers
21st-century American philosophers
Harvard University faculty
1937 births
Members of the National Academy of Medicine